The 2017 Tennessee Tech Golden Eagles football team represented Tennessee Technological University as a member of Ohio Valley Conference (OVC) during the 2017 NCAA Division I FCS football season. Led by Marcus Satterfield in his second and final season as head coach, the Golden Eagles compiled an overall record of 1–10 overall with a mark of 1–7 in conference play, placing last out of nine teams in the OVC. Tennessee Tech played home games at Tucker Stadium in Cookeville, Tennessee.

On November 19, Satterfield was fired. He finished his tenure at Tennessee Tech with a two-year record of 6–16.

Schedule

Game summaries

Western Illinois

at Kennesaw State

at Ball State

at Eastern Kentucky

Jacksonville State

at Eastern Illinois

at Southeast Missouri State

Tennessee State

Austin Peay

at Murray State

UT Martin

References

Tennessee Tech
Tennessee Tech Golden Eagles football seasons
Tennessee Tech Golden Eagles football